Thiohalocapsa is a Gram-negative and non-motile genus of bacteria from the family of Chromatiaceae.

References

Chromatiales
Bacteria genera
Taxa described in 1998